Yyteri is a district and a beach in the city of Pori, Finland. Yyteri is not an urban district, instead it is mostly like a holiday resort.

Yyteri Beach
Yyteri is famous for its beach, which stretches for about six kilometres. It is very popular among both local people and people from elsewhere in Finland. The beach is one of the longest in Finland and all of Nordic countries, and has also many distinctive dunes. The dune area is unique in Europe because of its size.

There was a unisex nudist area in the centre of the beach, which was a few hundred metres wide, one of only two in the entire country in Finland; however, it was closed due to complaints from concerned parents in April 2021. In 1965 Rolling Stones played their first ever Finnish concert in Yyteri.

Other interests
As well as the beach, Yyteri also has a spa, hotels and a restaurant.

Bus routes operate daily between Yyteri and the centre of Pori.

The well-being of Yyteri's local pinetrees is threatened by Acantholyda posticalis, the control of which is being tested with roundworms in 2011.

See also
 Kaanaa
 Mäntyluoto
 Kalajoki Beach

References

External links

Official webpages of Yyteri
The Rolling Stones in Yyteri at YouTube

Pori
Beaches of Finland
Tourist attractions in Satakunta
Landforms of Satakunta
Nude beaches